Charles Hugh Roberson (May 10, 1919 – June 8, 1988) was an American actor and stuntman.

Biography
Roberson was born near Shannon, Texas, the son of farmer Ollie W. Roberson and Jannie Hamm Roberson. Raised on cattle ranches in Shannon, Texas, and Roswell, New Mexico, he left school at 13 to become a cowhand and oilfield roughneck. He married and took his wife and daughter to California, where he joined the Culver City Police Department and guarded the gate at MGM studios. Following army service in World War II, he returned to the police force. During duty at Warner Bros. studios during a labor strike, he met stuntman Guy Teague, who alerted him to a stunt job at Republic Pictures. Teague had been John Wayne's stunt double for many years and was able to show him the ropes. Chuck also resembled John Carrol whom Roberson doubled in his first picture, Wyoming (1947). He played small roles and stunted in other roles in the same film. He graduated to larger supporting roles in westerns for Wayne and John Ford, and to a parallel career as a second-unit director. 

His television appearances include The Lone Ranger, The Adventures of Kit Carson, Lawman, Death Valley Days, Have Gun – Will Travel, Laramie, Gunsmoke, The Virginian, Laredo, Bonanza, Daniel Boone, and The Big Valley. Roberson also appeared in Disney's television Westerns The Swamp Fox and Texas John Slaughter. They were part of The Wonderful World of Color. Prior to that, he portrayed a Confederate Prison Captain in The Great Locomotive Chase.

In 1979 he published an autobiography, co-authored by Bodie Thoene, entitled “The Fall Guy:  30 Years as the Duke's Double”. Roberson died of cancer in Bakersfield, California and is buried next to his brother, actor Lou Roberson in Los Angeles. 

Bob Dylan drew him as Long Tom in his Beaten Path series, the drawing is entitled "Untitled 1" and is based on a frame from the film Winchester '73 (1950).

His remains are interred at Forest Lawn Memorial Park, Hollywood Hills.

Filmography (Actor)

Plainsman and the Lady (1946) – Deputy (uncredited)
Calendar Girl (1947) – Swedish Tug of War Man (uncredited)
Song of Scheherazade (1947) – Midshipman (uncredited)
Jesse James Rides Again (1947, Serial) – Lafe (uncredited)
The Flame (1947) – Policeman (uncredited)
Albuquerque (1948) – Man at Gambling Table (uncredited)
California Firebrand (1948) – Gunman (uncredited)
The Arizona Ranger (1948) – Henchman (uncredited)
The Gallant Legion (1948) – Ranger (uncredited)
Homicide for Three (1948) – Joe – Policeman (uncredited)
Last of the Wild Horses (1948) – Deputy Chuck (uncredited)
Wake of the Red Witch (1948) (with John Wayne) – Seaman (uncredited)
Stampede (1949) – Sandy (uncredited)
Roughshod (1949) – Deputy (uncredited)
Law of the Golden West (1949) – Wagon Driver (uncredited)
Hellfire (1949) – Groper (uncredited)
Haunted Trails (1949) – Ranch Hand Ed (uncredited)
The James Brothers of Missouri (1949) – Townsman (uncredited)
The Fighting Kentuckian (1949) (with John Wayne) – Militiaman (uncredited)
Western Renegades (1949) – Jones (uncredited)
Trail of the Rustlers (1950) – Bob – Henchman (uncredited)
The Capture (1950) – Employee (uncredited)
Outcast of Black Mesa (1950) – Kramer – Henchman
Cow Town (1950) – Mike Grady – Henchman
Winchester '73 (1950) – Long Tom (uncredited)
Hills of Oklahoma (1950) – Cowhand (uncredited)
Hi-Jacked (1950) – Police Officer (uncredited)
Atom Man vs. Superman (1950, Serial) – Policeman on Road [Chs. 11–12, 14] (uncredited)
Rio Grande (1950) – Officer / Indian Who Fires Arrow Into Col. York's Chest (uncredited)
Frontier Outpost (1950) – Gopher – Henchman (uncredited)
Lightning Guns (1950) – Hank Burch – Henchman (uncredited)
The Bandit Queen (1950) – Deputy (uncredited)
Ridin' the Outlaw Trail (1951) – Henchman Reno (uncredited)
Oh! Susanna (1951) – Barfly (uncredited)
The Last Outpost (1951) – Confederate Corporal (uncredited)
Cattle Drive (1951) – Chuck Saunders (uncredited)
Fort Dodge Stampede (1951) – Henchman Ragan
Indian Uprising (1952) – Taggart Man (uncredited)
Buffalo Bill in Tomahawk Territory (1952) – Trooper (uncredited)
Cattle Town (1952) – Rider (uncredited)
The Lusty Men (1952) – Cowboy (uncredited)
Way of a Gaucho (1952) – Gaucho (uncredited)
Blackbeard the Pirate (1952) – Mounted Soldier (uncredited)
Abbott and Costello Meet Captain Kidd (1952) – Pirate (uncredited)
The Blazing Forest (1952) – Lumberjack (uncredited)
Cow Country (1953) – Stubby
Raiders of the Seven Seas (1953) – Spanish Officer (uncredited)
Hannah Lee: An American Primitive (1953) – Cowboy (uncredited)
Gun Belt (1953) – Oliver
Calamity Jane (1953) – Barfly (uncredited)
Hondo (1953) (with John Wayne) – Kloori / Cavalry Sgt. killed in Indian Attack (uncredited)
Jubilee Trail (1954) – Man at Bar (uncredited)
The Lone Gun (1954) – Luke (uncredited)
The Far Country (1954) – Latigo (uncredited)
Sign of the Pagan (1954) – Mirrai
Ten Wanted Men (1955) – Campbell's Rider / Henchman (uncredited)
Timberjack (1955) – Lumberjack (uncredited)
The Prodigal (1955) – Chieftain (uncredited)
The Tall Men (1955) – Alva Jenkin – Jayhawker Leader (uncredited)
The Second Greatest Sex (1955) – Brawler (uncredited)
The Great Locomotive Chase (1956) – Confederate Prison Captain (uncredited)
Red Sundown (1956) – Henshaw's Man (uncredited)
The Searchers (1956) (with John Wayne) – Ranger at Wedding (uncredited)
The Rawhide Years (1956) – Johnny (uncredited)
Seven Men from Now (1956) – Mason
The King and Four Queens (1956) – Posseman (uncredited)
The Wings of Eagles (1957) (with John Wayne) – Officer (uncredited)
Night Passage (1957) – Roan
Run of the Arrow (1957) – Sergeant
The Hired Gun (1957) – Frank Cooper – Conroy Ranch Wrangler (uncredited)
Forty Guns (1957) – Howard Swain
The Big Country (1958) – Terrill Cowboy
Man of the West (1958) – Rifleman-Guard on Train (uncredited)
Rio Bravo (1959) (with John Wayne) – Gunman (uncredited)
The Wonderful Country (1959) – Barton
Sergeant Rutledge (1960) – Court-Martial Board Member (uncredited)
Spartacus (1960) – Slave (uncredited)
The Alamo (1960) (with John Wayne) – Tennessean
Two Rode Together (1961) – Comanche (uncredited)
The Man Who Shot Liberty Valance (1962) (with John Wayne) – Henchman (uncredited)
Merrill's Marauders (1962) – Officer
How the West Was Won (1962) – Officer (uncredited)
Donovan's Reef (1963) (with John Wayne) – Festus (uncredited)
Shock Corridor (1963) – Wilkes
McLintock! (1963) (with John Wayne) – Sheriff Jeff Lord 
Mail Order Bride (1964) – Saloon Brawler (uncredited)
Advance to the Rear (1964) – Monk (uncredited)
Cheyenne Autumn (1964) – Jessie (uncredited)
The Rounders (1965) – Brawler (uncredited)
Black Spurs (1965) – Norton – Prisoner
Shenandoah (1965) – Rebel Commander with Mustache Who Orders to Take the Union Cow (uncredited)
The Sons of Katie Elder (1965) (with John Wayne) – Townsman (uncredited)
Cat Ballou (1965) – Armed Guard (uncredited)
Nevada Smith (1966) – Deputy (uncredited)
Blindfold (1966) – Fitzpatrick's Henchman (uncredited)
Smoky (1966) – Chuck – a Ranchhand
Daniel Boone: Frontier Trail Rider (1966) – Dutch, Teamster
The Adventures of Bullwhip Griffin (1967) – Cook (uncredited)
Welcome to Hard Times (1967) – Miner Fighting Bert (uncredited)
The War Wagon (1967) (with John Wayne) – Brown / Mustachioed Guard at blown bridge
El Dorado (1967) (with John Wayne) – Jason's Gunman (uncredited)
The Scalphunters (1968) – Scalphunter
The Green Berets (1968) (with John Wayne) – Sgt. Griffin
Hellfighters (1968) (with John Wayne) – Firefighter in Air Plane (uncredited)
The Undefeated (1969) (with John Wayne) – Yankee Sgt. at River (uncredited)
Chisum (1970) (with John Wayne) – Trail Herder (uncredited)
Rio Lobo (1970) (with John Wayne) – Corporal in Baggage Car (uncredited)
Big Jake (1971) (with John Wayne) – Texas Ranger (uncredited)
Cahill U.S. Marshal (1973) (with John Wayne) – Leader of the Bunch
McQ (1974) (with John Wayne) – Bodyguard (uncredited)
99 and 44/100% Dead (1974) – Gunman

Television
The Lone Ranger – episode – Return of the Convict – Tod Gunder (uncredited) (1949)
The Lone Ranger – episode – Six Guns Legacy – Henchman Joe (Credit only) (1949)
The Lone Ranger – episode – The Renegades – Henchman at Cave (uncredited) (1949)
Cowboy G-Men – episode – Koniackers – Lefty (1952)
The Adventures of Rin Tin Tin – episode – The Lonesome Road – Manley Stevens (1955)
Panic! – episode – The Vigilantes – Sam Glenn (1957)
Death Valley Days – episode – The Trial of Red Haskell (1957)
Wide Wide World – episode – The Western – Himself (1958)
Wagon Train – episode – The Bije Wilcox Story – Captain Thorpe (1958)
Cimarron City – episode – A Respectable Girl (1958)
Walt Disney's Wonderful World of Color – episodes – Texas John Slaughter, Texas John Slaughter: Ambush in Laredo, and Texas John Slaughter: Showdown at Sandoval – Ranger Sam (1958–1959)
Walt Disney's Wonderful World of Color – episode – The Swamp Fox: The Birth of the Swamp Fox – Jenkins, and Stunt Man (1959)
Cimarron City – episode – Blind is the Killer – Foreman (1959)
Walt Disney's Wonderful World of Color – episode – The Swamp Fox: Brother Against Brother – Jenkins (1959)
Walt Disney's Wonderful World of Color – episode – The Swamp Fox: A Woman's Courage – Milo (uncredited) (1959)
Gunsmoke – episode – Cheyennes – Sgt. Keller (1959)
Yancy Derringer – episode – Two Tickets to Promontory – Henchman (uncredited) (1959)
Bat Masterson – episode – The Disappearance of Bat Masterson – Henchman about to be Sawn in Half (1960)
Death Valley Days – episode – Splinter Station – Sgt. Jim Laughlin (1960)
Gunsmoke – episode – Speak me Fair – Driver (1960)
Gunsmoke – episode – Abe Blocker – Joe (1962)
Have Gun - Will Travel – The Campaign of Billy Banjo – Rancher (1960)
Have Gun - Will Travel – The Legacy – Pike (1960)
Laramie – episode – Midnight Rebellion – Burke (uncredited) (1960)
Laramie – episode – Riders of the Night – Chet – Gang Member (1961)
Laramie – episode – The Killer Legend – Marker (1961)
Have Gun - Will Travel – Soledad Crossing – Man Guarding River Crossing (1961)
Have Gun - Will Travel – Ben Jalisco – Carly (1961)
Wagon Train – episode – The Colter Craven Story – Junior (uncredited) (1960)
The Detectives – episode – Secret Assignment – Enforcer (1961)
Stagecoach West – episode – A Place of Still Waters – Matt (1961) 
Tales of Wells Fargo – The Traveler – Lee (1962)
Laramie – episode – Among the Missing – Croft (1962)
Gunsmoke – episode – The Glory and the Mud – Stage Driver (uncredited) (1964)
Daniel Boone – episode – Ken-Tuck-E – Dark Panther (1964)
The Virginian – episode – Six Graves at Cripple Creek – Wagon Driver (1965)
Daniel Boone – episode – Fifty Rifles – Ruffian (1966)
Daniel Boone – episodes – The High Cumberland Parts 1 and 2 – Dutch (1966)
Daniel Boone – episode – The Matchmaker – Shawnee Leader (1966)
Bonanza – episode – Horse of a Different Hue – Larcher (1966)
Laredo – episode – The Legend of Midas Mantee – Rafer (1966)
Lost in Space – episode – The Deadly Games of Gamma 6 – Alien Giant (1966)
Mister Terrific – episode – Stanley the Jailbreaker – Dawson (1967)
Daniel Boone – episode – The Young Ones – Lige Henry (1967)
The Big Valley – episodes – Night in a Small Town, Ladykiller, and the Disappearance – Stagecoach Driver (1967)
Lancer – episode – The high Riders (1968)
Mod Squad – episode – A Run for the Money – Caine (1969)

Filmography (Stunt Man) (All uncredited)

Jesse James Rides Again (1947)
Angel and the Badman (with John Wayne) (1947)
The Three Musketeers (1948)
Wake of the Red Witch (with John Wayne) (1948)
The Fighting Kentuckian (with John Wayne)  (1949)
Rio Grande (with John Wayne) (1950)
The Last Outpost (1951)
Blackbeard the Pirate (1952)
Hondo (with John Wayne)  (1953)
Calamity Jane (1953)
The Far Country (1954)
The Man from Laramie (1955)
The Conqueror (with John Wayne) (1956)
Red Sundown (1956)
The Great Locomotive Chase (1956)
The Searchers (with John Wayne) (1956)
The Wings of Eagles – Stunt Double: John Wayne  (with John Wayne) (1957)
Forty Guns (1957)
The Barbarian and the Geisha (with John Wayne) (1958)
Rio Bravo (with John Wayne) (1959)
Laramie – TV series (1959)
The Alamo (with John Wayne) (1960)
Sergeant Rutledge (1960)
The Comancheros (with John Wayne) (1961)
The Man Who Shot Liberty Valance (with John Wayne) (1962)
Hatari! (with John Wayne) (1962)
How the West Was Won – Stunt Double: John Wayne (with John Wayne) (1962)
Gunsmoke – TV series – episode – Abe Blocker – Stunt Double: Chill Wills (1962)
Donovan's Reef (with John Wayne) (1963)
Cheyenne Autumn – Jessie (uncredited) (1964)
The Sons of Katie Elder (with John Wayne) (1965)
The Rounders (1965)
The War Lord (1965)
Nevada Smith (1966)
El Dorado (with John Wayne) (1966)
The War Wagon (with John Wayne) (1967)
The Green Berets (with John Wayne) (1968)
Hellfighters  (with John Wayne) (1968)
The Undefeated (with John Wayne) (1969)
Chisum (with John Wayne) (1970)
Rio Lobo (with John Wayne) (1970)
A Man Called Horse (1970)
Big Jake – Stunt Double: John Wayne (with John Wayne) (1971)
Shoot Out (1971)
The Cowboys – Stunt Double: John Wayne (with John Wayne) (1972)
The Train Robbers (with John Wayne) (1973)
Cahill U.S. Marshal (with John Wayne) (1973)
McQ (with John Wayne) (1974)
Rooster Cogburn – Stunt Double: John Wayne (with John Wayne) (1975)
The Shootist (with John Wayne)  (1976)
Blue Thunder (1983)

References

External links

 
 
 

1919 births
1988 deaths
20th-century American male actors
American male film actors
American male television actors
American stunt performers
Deaths from cancer in California
Male actors from Texas
Male Western (genre) film actors
Western (genre) television actors